The 2009 Türk Telecom İzmir Cup was a professional tennis tournament played on outdoor hard courts. It was part of the 2009 ATP Challenger Tour. It took place in İzmir, Turkey between May 11 and May 17, 2009.

Singles entrants

Seeds

 Rankings are as of May 4, 2009.

Other entrants
The following players received wildcards into the singles main draw:
  Haluk Akkoyun
  Sami Beceren
  Barış Ergüden
  Ergün Zorlu

The following players received entry from the qualifying draw:
  Matthias Bachinger
  Joshua Goodall (as a Lucky loser)
  Conor Niland
  Ivan Sergeyev
  Joseph Sirianni

Champions

Singles

 Andrea Stoppini def.  Marsel İlhan, 7–6(5), 6–2

Doubles

 Jonathan Erlich /  Harel Levy def.  Prakash Amritraj /  Rajeev Ram, 6–3, 6–3

External links
2009 Draws
Official website
ITF search 

 
Turk Telecom Izmir Cup
2009 in Turkish tennis
May 2009 sports events in Turkey